The 2020 Liège–Bastogne–Liège was a Belgian road cycling one-day race that was originally scheduled for 26 April 2020. Due to the COVID-19 pandemic, it was rescheduled to 4 October, and it was the 106th edition of Liège–Bastogne–Liège and part of the 2020 UCI World Tour.

The race was won by Primož Roglič in a tumultuous sprint amongst a group of five riders, beating world champion Julian Alaphilippe, who already had put his hands in the air, in a photo finish. Alaphilippe, however, was later relegated to fifth place for hindering Marc Hirschi in the sprint. This moved Hirschi up into second, while 2020 Tour de France winner Tadej Pogačar was moved up into third.

Teams
All nineteen UCI WorldTeams and six UCI ProTeams made up the twenty-five teams of seven riders each that participated in the race. 125 of the 175 riders in the race finished.

UCI WorldTeams

 
 
 
 
 
 
 
 
 
 
 
 
 
 
 
 
 
 
 

UCI Professional Continental teams

Result

References

Liege-Bastogne-Liege
Liege-Bastogne-Liege
Liege-Bastogne-Liege
Liège–Bastogne–Liège
Liege-Bastogne-Liege